The 1989 Royal Rumble was the second annual Royal Rumble professional wrestling event produced by the World Wrestling Federation (WWF, now WWE). After the inaugural event aired as a television special, the 1989 event aired on pay-per-view (PPV), thus becoming one of the WWF's original four annual PPV events, along with WrestleMania, SummerSlam, and Survivor Series, which would become recognized as the "Big Four". It took place on January 15, 1989, at The Summit in Houston, Texas. It centered on the Royal Rumble match, a modified battle royal in which participants enter at timed intervals instead of all beginning in the ring at the same time.

Six matches were contested at the event, including two dark matches. The main event was the 1989 Royal Rumble match, which was won by Big John Studd, who last eliminated Ted DiBiase. Featured matches on the undercard were Jim Duggan and The Hart Foundation (Bret Hart and Jim Neidhart) defeating Dino Bravo and The Fabulous Rougeaus (Jacques and Raymond Rougeau) in a two-out-of-three falls match, Rockin' Robin defeating Judy Martin to retain the WWF Women's Championship, and King Haku defeating Harley Race to retain his King of the Ring crown and cape.

Production

Background
In 1988, the World Wrestling Federation (WWF, now WWE) debuted the Royal Rumble match, although a non-televised version had been tested in 1987. The match was a modified battle royal in which the participants entered at timed intervals instead of all beginning in the ring at the same time. The inaugural match featured 20 wrestlers and the inaugural event was named after the match. A second event was scheduled to be held on January 15, 1989, at The Summit in Houston, Texas, thus establishing the Royal Rumble as an annual January event. The previous year's event had been shown as a television special on the USA Network. The 1989 event was instead aired on pay-per-view (PPV), being the first Royal Rumble to be broadcast on PPV, in turn becoming one of the promotion's original four pay-per-views, along with WrestleMania, SummerSlam, and Survivor Series, which would be dubbed the "Big Four". It was also the first to feature 30 wrestlers in the titular match, which is now the traditional number of participants.

Storylines
The card consisted of four matches. The matches resulted from scripted storylines, where wrestlers portrayed heroes, villains, or less distinguishable characters to build tension and culminated in a wrestling match or series of matches. Results were predetermined by WWF's writers, with storylines produced on their weekly television shows, Superstars, Wrestling Challenge, and Prime Time Wrestling.

The main feud heading into the Royal Rumble was between the 30 superstars from the entire World Wrestling Federation (WWF) who had selected to participate in the first-ever 30 man Royal Rumble match. Big John Studd returned to WWF in late 1988 and turned babyface after not siding with former manager Bobby Heenan and began a feud with Heenan's client André the Giant. Both men signed to participate in the Royal Rumble match. Mr. Perfect, who joined WWF in the summer of 1988 was pushed as an undefeated heel wrestler, entering his name into the match. Bad News Brown was pushed as an arrogant powerful heel who was an enemy of face and heel wrestlers. As a result, he also entered his name into the match. Many tag team wrestlers also selected to participate in the match and selected their entry numbers. The Mega Powers (Hulk Hogan and WWF Champion Randy Savage) were involved in a feud with The Twin Towers (Akeem and The Big Boss Man) since November 1988. At Survivor Series, Mega Powers became the survivors for their team in Survivor Series match against Twin Towers. Since then, Mega Powers and Twin Towers had been at odds and both teams signed to participate in the Royal Rumble.

The second feud heading into the event featured Jim Duggan against Dino Bravo and The Fabulous Rougeaus (Jacques and Raymond Rougeau). Since joining the WWF in early 1987, Duggan used an American patriot gimmick, coming to the ring with an American flag and feuding with non-American wrestlers in the WWF roster (such as Nikolai Volkoff). In early 1989, Duggan began feuding with the French-Canadians Bravo and the Rougeau brothers battling them with different partners. At a live event on January 6 in Montreal, Duggan teamed with Hulk Hogan and Ron Garvin to defeat Bravo and the Rougeaus. He was scheduled to battle Bravo and Rougeaus in a two out of three falls match at Royal Rumble, so he found partners in The Hart Foundation (Bret Hart and Jim Neidhart). Hart Foundation and Rougeau Brothers had been feuding with each other since 1987. Rougeaus unsuccessfully challenged Harts several times for the WWF Tag Team Championship in summer of 1987 but did not become champions. They were in opposite teams against each other at Survivor Series 1988, where Bret eliminated Rougeau in the first place.

Event

Before the event aired live on pay-per-view (PPV), Jim Powers defeated Barry Horowitz and Sam Houston defeated Steve Lombardi in dark matches.

Premilinary matches
The first televised match was a two out of three falls match between Jim Duggan and The Hart Foundation (Bret Hart and Jim Neidhart) vs. Dino Bravo and The Fabulous Rougeaus (Jacques Rougeau and Raymond Rougeau). The powerful Neidhart and Bravo started the match. Duggan tagged in and Bravo ran to tag in Raymond. Duggan caught Raymond and connected with a scoop slam and an Old Glory. Duggan tagged in Bret Hart, who pinned Raymond with an inside cradle for a near-fall. He got Raymond with a sunset flip pinfall and then he hit a diving crossbody for another near-fall. Jacques tagged in and got a near-fall with a sunset flip on Hart but Hart clotheslined Jacques and took him to the corner. Jacques' partners did his help but Neidhart grinded Bravo and Raymond by a shoulder block. Raymond pulled the rope down causing Hart to fall on the floor. Bravo hit a side suplex in the ring but didn't cover and instead tagged in Raymond who hit Hart with a Bombe de Rougeau and pinned him to get the first fall. Rougeau brothers continued to beat Hart, who was caught in Jacques' Boston crab. Hart managed to reach in his corner. Jacques tried to hit a bulldog on Hart but Hart countered it into an inverted atomic drop. Duggan tagged in and hit a scoop slam on Raymond, followed by a forearm smash by Neidhart. He hit Bravo with a shoulder block and Duggan slingshotted Hart on Raymond and hit an elbow drop on Raymond and pinned him, getting the second fall. Bravo tagged in and hit Duggan with an atomic drop, sending Duggan in the corner who tagged Hart. Hart followed it up with a backbreaker on Bravo but Raymond shoved him from the ropes when Hart tried to hit an elbow drop. All the six men began brawling. The referee was distracted. Duggan took advantage and hit Bravo with his 2x4. Hart pinned Bravo to get the third fall and the victory.

The second match was for the WWF Women's Championship between defending champion Rockin' Robin and Judy Martin. Before the match began, former champion Sensational Sherri was in the ring and challenged the winner to a future championship match claiming neither were as much woman as she was, before joining Gorilla Monsoon and Jesse "The Body" Ventura at the announcers table. Robin and Martin had a lot of near-falls during the match. However, in the end, Robin hit Martin with a diving crossbody and pinned her to win the match and retain the title.

Next was a posedown between WWF Intercontinental Heavyweight Champion Ultimate Warrior and Rick Rude. The winner had to be decided by fan reaction. There were four categories: "Double Biceps", "Best Abs", "Most Muscular" and "Medley of Poses". Warrior won in every posedown. Rude, however, attacked Warrior with his own metal workout bar.

The third match was between King Haku and Harley Race. The winner of that match would win the "King of Wrestling" crown, held by Haku. Race began the match by hitting Haku with knee lifts and suplexes. Haku no-sold Race headbutts. Race hit Haku with a piledriver for a near-fall. Haku suplexed Race for a near-fall. He missed an elbow drop on Race and both men went to the floor. Haku backdropped a piledriver attempt by Race. Race hit a swinging neckbreaker for another near-fall. Haku made a comeback by hitting Race with chops but missed a flying splash. Race missed a diving headbutt. Both men got up and Race ran through the ropes but Haku hit him with a thrust kick to win the match.  This match was edited off the Coliseum Video release but included in the Royal Rumble Anthology DVD edition as well as the version on the WWE Network.

Main event
The main event was the 1989 Royal Rumble match. The first Royal Rumble occurred in 1988, but it consisted of 20 men. The 1989 Royal Rumble was the second Royal Rumble but the first to have 30 men and the first to air on pay-per-view. WWF Tag Team Champions Demolition (Ax and Smash) drew Nos. 1 and 2 in the match. The two tag team championship partners battled with each other until the #3 entrant André the Giant came in. They battled André until Mr. Perfect entered at #4. André eliminated Smash while Perfect and Ax began working on him. Ron Garvin entered at #5 and he also assisted Perfect and Ax in triple-teaming André, who was the largest person in the match. Greg Valentine entered at #6 while André eliminated Garvin. Perfect, Ax and Valentine triple-teamed André until Jake Roberts entered at #7. This made Roberts the first man to participate in two Royal Rumble events. The other participants let André and Roberts worked on him alone. Andre choked Roberts and threw him over the top rope. Ron Bass entered at #8. Ax and Bass battled each other while Perfect and Valentine restarted double-teaming André; André eventually got the upper hand and, after beating back Perfect, began choking Valentine until he was unconscious. One half of The Rockers, Shawn Michaels entered at #9. Perfect hit a back body drop on Ax over the top rope, eliminating him. He tried to eliminate Michaels too but Michaels used a skin the cat to come back into the ring and almost tossed Perfect. Butch Miller, one half of The Bushwhackers entered at #10. Jake Roberts came back and tossed his snake Damien inside the ring. André saw the snake, freaked out and eliminated himself from the match. Roberts took his snake and went back. The Honky Tonk Man entered at #11. Honky and Valentine both tried to eliminate Michaels but failed. One half of Strike Force, Tito Santana entered at #12 and beat out Perfect before focusing on Valentine. Bass and Perfect double suplexed Michaels. Bad News Brown entered at #13. Santana and Butch eliminated Honky while Brown messed around with Michaels until Michaels' tag team partner Marty Jannetty entered at #14. They both got together and double dropkicked Ron Bass over the top rope. Santana hit Valentine with a flying forearm smash.

One half of The Mega Powers, WWF World Heavyweight Champion Randy Savage entered at #15 and went after Brown. Valentine hit Savage with a Hammer Drop and tried to eliminate him but Savage stayed in. Santana aided Savage in beating Valentine until one half of The Brain Busters, Arn Anderson entered at #16. Savage backdropped Valentine over the top rope. Anderson and Savage clotheslined Michaels over the top rope, eliminating him. Jannetty pounded on Anderson. Anderson's tag team partner Tully Blanchard entered at #17. Jannetty and Blanchard beat each other. Perfect and Savage nicely exchanged each other's moves. Anderson aided Blanchard in hitting Jannetty with a spinning spinebuster. Blanchard dumped Jannetty over the top rope but Jannetty grabbed the second rope to stay in the match, 
only to be eliminated by Blanchard anyway. Savage's tag team partner Hulk Hogan entered at #18 and dumped out Perfect. However, Perfect broke the longevity record, lasting 27:58. Anderson dumped Santana. Brown and Hogan had near-eliminations with each other. Butch's tag team partner Luke Williams entered at #19. Hogan and Brown eliminated Butch, leaving six men in the ring. Hogan and Savage were double-teamed by other four men Brown, Anderson, Blanchard and Luke. Koko B. Ware entered at #20 and dropkicked all four of them. Anderson climbed over the top rope but Hogan scoop slammed him. Koko hunted Hogan but was dumped out over the ring, getting eliminated. Hogan punched The Brainbusters away and then eliminated Luke. The Brainbusters went for a double clothesline on Hogan but he ducked and instead clotheslined them over the top rope. The Warlord, one half of The Powers of Pain entered at #21, but as soon as he entered the ring, he was eliminated by Hogan. Warlord set the record of the shortest time in the ring with spending only 2 seconds in the ring, a record that stood 20 years until Santino Marella was eliminated in 1 second at the 2009 Royal Rumble. Brown and Savage battled each other. Hogan dumped both men out. Savage berated Hogan, beginning the breakup of Mega Powers. The two tried to battle each other until Miss Elizabeth told them to calm down. The duo embraced before Savage left.

One half of The Twin Towers, the Big Boss Man entered at #22. Hogan scoop slammed Big Boss Man but Boss Man hit him a corner avalanche and a piledriver. Hogan tried to get rid of Boss Man, until Boss Man's tag team partner Akeem entered at #23. The duo double-teamed Hogan and eliminated him. Hogan's friend Brutus Beefcake entered at #24 and took on the Twin Towers. Despite being officially eliminated, Hogan remained at ring side and fought with Boss Man outside. After intervention from match officials, the Boss Man re-entered the ring and Twin Towers double-teamed Beefcake until Hogan pulled the rope down, sending the Boss Man over the top rope and eliminating him from the match. The duo continued to battle each other all the way to the locker room. With this last elimination, Hogan broke the elimination record in a single Royal Rumble match with ten. Akeem tried to eliminate Beefcake until The Red Rooster entered at #25. Rooster and Beefcake double-teamed the big Akeem until the Warlord's tag team partner The Barbarian entered at #26 and broke up Rooster and Beefcake's double-teaming on Akeem. He battled with Beefcake while Rooster received a 747 Splash by Akeem. Big John Studd entered at #27 and went after Akeem. Hercules entered at #28 followed by already eliminated Tito Santana's tag team partner Rick Martel, who entered at #29. Everyone was punching each other before the final entrant, Ted DiBiase entered at #30. DiBiase bought the slot from manager Slick to get a better spot. He eliminated Rooster and then went after his rival Hercules, whom DiBiase had bought as a slave. Beefcake saved DiBiase and battled Hercules. DiBiase sneaked out behind and eliminated both men from the ring, leaving it to the final five participants – Akeem, Barbarian, Studd, Martel and DiBiase. Barbarian manhandled Martel but Martel was able to avoid a clothesline by Barbarian. He dropkicked Barbarian over the top rope, leaving it to Akeem, Studd, Martel and DiBiase. Martel hit a diving crossbody on Akeem but the big man caught him and throw him over the top rope. Akeem, Studd and DiBiase were the final three participants. DiBiase and Akeem spent some time in double-teaming Studd before they quarreled with each other. Studd took advantage and dumped Akeem. Studd and DiBiase remained the final two participants. Studd slammed DiBiase and followed it up with a butterfly suplex. After a clothesline, Studd threw DiBiase over the top rope to eliminate him and win the 1989 Royal Rumble. This made Studd the first man to win a 30-man Royal Rumble (the previous match had 20 entrants).

Aftermath
The Royal Rumble became an important part in the breakup of The Mega Powers. Hulk Hogan accidentally eliminated Randy Savage from the match. On the February 3 The Main Event II, Hogan and Savage faced The Twin Towers (Akeem and Big Boss Man) in a tag team match, filled with controversy. During the climax of the match, Akeem threw Savage through the ropes onto the floor with Savages body hitting Elizabeth in the process.  Hogan did not help Savage and turned his attention to an unconscious Elizabeth. Savage questioned what was happening but Hogan did not reply. Hogan picked Liz up and took her to backstage. Hogan left Savage alone in the ring to handle the Twin Towers. When Hogan returned to the ring, Savage slapped him in the face, took the championship belt and left Hogan alone in the ring with the Twin Towers. Hogan still managed to pick up the win, however, but afterward got into a heated argument with Savage backstage. Savage declared that Hogan was jealous of him, that he lusted after Elizabeth, and that he would defeat Hogan if it came to it for the belt. Hogan tried to talk sense into Savage but was unsuccessful as the Macho Man turned heel on his now former partner by attacking both him and Brutus Beefcake, who tried to intervene on Hogan's behalf. Hogan and Savage then began feuding with each other, which culminated in a match at WrestleMania V dubbed "The Mega Powers Explode" where Savage, who had won the WWF World Heavyweight Championship over a year earlier at WrestleMania IV with Hogan in his corner, would defend against his former friend. Hogan defeated Savage to win the title ending Savage's reign of 371 days.

Jake Roberts and André the Giant continued their feud during the rest of the winter of 1989, with the returning Big John Studd becoming involved in their WrestleMania V match as the guest referee.

The Ultimate Warrior vowed revenge against Rick Rude for his attack after the posedown, to which Rude replied that he wanted a match for the Intercontinental Championship held by Warrior. Over the next couple of months, Rude would regularly appear at ringside midway through Warrior's matches with World champion Savage, luring the Warrior outside and causing him to be counted out (then afterwards embracing Savage to emphasise the latter's heel turn.)  At WrestleMania V, Rude won the Intercontinental title, using outside interference from manager Bobby Heenan to pin Warrior. Rude thus became the first champion in the Heenan Family.

The Rockin' Robin-Judy Martin match for the WWF Women's Championship match was the last women's match for a championship title conducted at a major WWF pay-per-view event for nearly five years. Robin left the company in June 1989 and – with little to no interest in women's wrestling at the time – the title was deactivated in February 1990. The title remained vacant until 1993, when Alundra Blayze won a tournament to become the new champion.

The Royal Rumble marked the WWF PPV debut of The Bushwhackers, who arrived in WWF in December 1988 after leaving WCW whilst in the finals of their United States Tag Team titie tournament.  The Bushwhackers would go on to feud with the Brain Busters throughout the early part of 1989 on the house show circuit.  Another PPV debut was former NWA World Heavyweight Champion "Rugged" Ronnie Garvin, who also arrived in December 1988 from a run in the AWA, after the Rumble he and Greg "The Hammer" Valentine would feud where they exchanged televised pinfall victories on WWF Superstars of Wrestling, with Valentine winning a "retirement match" on Superstars.

Steve Lombardi would be repackaged as "The Brooklyn Brawler" on an episode of Prime Time Wrestling later in January 1989 where he attacked The Red Rooster on the set of PTW at the urging of Bobby Heenan, which also "injured" host Gorilla Moonson and started a feud between the two.

Results

Royal Rumble entrances and eliminations
A new entrant came out approximately every 2 minutes.

^Jake Roberts had already been eliminated when he returned from the locker room with his bag. He then removed his pet, a boa constrictor called "Damien", from the bag and then slid into the ring to chase André The Giant away, who quickly eliminated himself over the top rope to escape Jake and his pet snake.

References

External links
Official website

1989
Events in Houston
1989 in Texas
Professional wrestling in Houston
1989 WWF pay-per-view events
January 1989 events in the United States

pl:WWE Royal Rumble#Royal Rumble 1989.5B4.5D